Al-Miftah is a sub-district located in al-Sha'ar District, Ibb Governorate, Yemen. Al-Miftah had a population of 1387 as of 2004.

References 

Sub-districts in Ash Sha'ar District